Strange People may refer to:
 Strange People (1933 film), an American mystery film
 Strange People (1969 film), a Soviet drama film